Mohammad Bana (born 6 August 1958 in Tehran) is an Iranian Greco-Roman wrestling coach and former wrestler.

He was the head coach of Iran national Greco-Roman wrestling team at London Olympics 2012 with was accompanied by three gold medals, and is regarded as the most successful coach in Iran's Greco-Roman wrestling history. The Iranian wrestlers won three Gold medals in the London 2012 Olympic Games by (Omid Norouzi, Ghasem Rezaei and Hamid Sourian).
He is also vice world champion in 1983 in Kiev, As well as the Asian champions at the 1983 tournament in Tehran.
Iranian team led Bana at 2010 Asian Games won 8 Gold medals.
After the particularly poor performance of his team at Rio Olympics 2016 and the surprising elimination of Iranian wrestlers (including Hamid Sourian) one after another, he said he felt "ashamed" toward them and was seen sitting and crying outside the wrestling stadium, the video and photos of which went viral in social media. He was later quoted as saying he cried because he failed to make the people happy, and that the team is like "his child".
Iranian football coach Ali Parvin and Ali Daei said he also burst into tears after watching Bana's cry, and praised him. Asr Iran published a commentary on the photos.

Career 
 Iran national wrestling team Coach (2005-2007)
 Iran national wrestling team Coach (2009-2012)
 Iran national wrestling team Coach (2014-2015)
 Iran national wrestling team Coach (2018-2022)

Awards 
 2012:  Order of Courage (1st Class) awarded by former President of Iran, Mahmoud Ahmadinejad.
 2012: Best Sports coach by ISNA
 2011: Best Coach of the year by United World Wrestling

References
FILA Database

External links 

 

Iranian male sport wrestlers
Living people
World Wrestling Championships medalists
Recipients of the Order of Courage (Iran)
1958 births
Olympic wrestlers of Iran
Sportspeople from Tehran
20th-century Iranian people
21st-century Iranian people